Confessions of a Teenage Drama Queen is a 2004 American teen musical comedy film directed by Sara Sugarman from a screenplay by Gail Parent, based on Dyan Sheldon's 1999 novel of the same name. It stars Lindsay Lohan as an aspiring teenage actress whose family moves from New York City to New Jersey, Adam Garcia as her favorite rock musician, Glenne Headly as her mother and Alison Pill as her best friend. The film introduced Megan Fox in her theatrical film acting debut.

It was released on February 20, 2004, by Buena Vista Pictures to mostly negative critical reaction, but was a modest commercial success, reaching number two at the box office, behind 50 First Dates. On July 20, 2004, it was released on VHS and DVD.

Plot
Narrator Mary Elizabeth "Lola" Steppe is a 15-year-old girl who grew up in New York City and wants desperately to become a famous Broadway actress. Much to her annoyance, she moves with her family to the suburbs of Dellwood, New Jersey, but she confidently tells the audience, "A legend is about to be born. That legend would be me."

At school, Lola befriends an unpopular girl, Ella Gerard, who shares her love for the rock band Sidarthur. Lola idolizes the band's lead singer, Stu Wolff. She also meets Sam, a cute boy who takes a liking to her, and makes enemies with Carla Santini, the most popular girl in school.

When Lola auditions for the school play, a modernized musical version of Pygmalion called Eliza Rocks, she is chosen over Carla to play Eliza, and Carla promises to make her life miserable. Lola also beats Carla on a dancing video game at an arcade, whereupon Carla reveals that she has tickets to the farewell concert of Sidarthur, which recently decided to dissolve. Afraid of being one-upped by Carla, Lola falsely claims that she and Ella also have tickets. She loses her chance to buy tickets and new clothes when her mother takes away her allowance, and the concert is sold out by the time she persuades Ella to pay for the tickets. However, Lola explains that they can buy tickets from a scalper, and gets Sam to sneak Eliza's dress out of the costume room for her to wear at the concert.

On the night of the concert, Lola and Ella take a train to New York City, but Lola accidentally leaves the money for the tickets on the train, and her plan to sneak into the concert fails. Lola and Ella finally give up and walk through the city to Stu's after-show party. When they arrive there, Stu stumbles drunkenly out of the building and passes out in an alley. The two girls take him to a diner to sober him up, but when he hits a cop with a doughnut, the three of them end up at a police station, where Lola gives her father's New York City address.

At this point, Lola's dishonesty becomes problematic. When she first met Ella, she tried to impress her by telling her a dramatic story about her father dying years earlier. Ella highly values honesty, so she becomes infuriated when she discovers that Lola's story was a lie. After Lola's father arrives, and they explain what happened, Stu gratefully takes them all back to the party, where Ella forgives Lola for lying (on the condition that she will never lie to her again), and the two girls see Carla, who sees them as well, and looks upset. Lola talks with Stu about his work, but is disappointed to discover that he is an alcoholic.

Back at school, Carla humiliates Lola by denying that she saw Lola or Ella at the party and calling Lola a liar. None of the other students believes Lola's story about being arrested with Stu and leaving her necklace at his house.

Afterward, Lola goes home, depressed, and refuses to perform in the play, but encouraged by Ella to return, she arrives backstage just in time to prevent Carla from taking over her part. As she is about to go onstage, her mother wishes her good luck and finally calls her by her nickname, Lola. The modernist interpretation of Pygmalion (Eliza Rocks) ensues. After a great performance that brings a standing ovation, the cast goes to an after-party at Carla's house, where Stu arrives to see Lola. Carla attempts to salvage her pride by saying he is there to see her, but is proved wrong when Stu gives Lola her necklace in front of everyone. As Carla's lies become apparent, she backs away from the crowd on the verge of tears and falls into a fountain, greeted by everyone's laughter. In a conciliatory gesture, Lola helps her up, and Carla accepts defeat. After dancing with Stu, Lola dances with Sam, and they eventually kiss.

Cast
Lindsay Lohan as Mary Elizabeth "Lola" Steppe, an eccentric girl and compulsive liar, who wants desperately to be a famous actress and behaves like she is constantly in a movie
Megan Fox as Carla Santini, Lola's enemy and queen bee of the school
Alison Pill as Ella Gerard, Lola's new best friend
Adam Garcia as Stuart "Stu" Wolff, the Sidarthur lead singer, who is drunk and depressing offstage
Eli Marienthal as Sam, a shy boy and Lola's love interest
Tom McCamus as Calum Steppe, Lola's father
Glenne Headly as Karen Steppe, Lola's mother
Carol Kane as Miss Baggoli, the director of school's play
Sheila McCarthy as Mrs. Gerard
Alison Sealy-Smith as Sgt. Rose
Ashley Leggat as Marcia, one of Carla's best friends
Barbara Mamabolo as Robin, one of Carla's best friends
Maggie Oskam as Paige Steppe, Lola's sister
Rachael Oskam as Paula Steppe, Lola's sister

Production

Filming
Pre-production began on May 5, 2003, beginning with choreography rehearsals and make-up tests. Produced on a budget of $15 million, filming began on June 4. Behind the camera was Welsh director Sara Sugarman, who was known for directing the musical comedy film Very Annie Mary. While taking place in New Jersey, the film was filmed in the Canadian cities of Toronto, Hamilton, and Oakville. Scenes at Dellwood High School were filmed at King City Secondary School in King City and Birchmount Park Collegiate Institute in Scarborough. Mall scenes were filmed at Erin Mills Town Centre in Mississauga. Scenes depicting the family's move from New York to New Jersey were filmed in Hamilton. It was also filmed on-location for the scenes in New York City. Scenes involving the train station were filmed at the Watchung Avenue Train Station in Montclair, New Jersey, on New Jersey Transit's Montclair-Boonton Line.

Casting
Originally, the role of Lola was offered to Hilary Duff. After Duff backed out of the film, Lindsay Lohan was cast as Lola. "The part that stuck out to me most about the story was how different Lola is", Lohan said. "She's really interesting. As outgoing as she is, she keeps a lot in and I think it's really good to see how her character develops throughout the story." Producer Robert Shapiro said, "Lindsay Lohan is absolutely a 500-watt bulb. She's delightful to watch, she's a typical teenager, and she's very wise, and all of that comes across in the part of Lola."

Alison Pill, who was known for co-starring in the Judy Garland biopic Life with Judy Garland: Me and My Shadows, was cast as Lola's best friend, Ella Gerard. "I think the attraction to play Ella is she changes so completely and goes through this huge transformation from being this girl who's terrified of being herself, and disappointing her parents, and disappointing their expectations, and at the end she says, 'I've just decided to be who I am.'" An unknown at the time, Megan Fox was cast as Carla Santini, Lola's nemesis (Brittany Gray played Fox's dance double). Eli Marienthal was cast as Sam, Lola's interest in high school and her friend. Marienthal had previously starred in Disney film The Country Bears. Glenne Headly was cast as Lola's mother, Karen, while Carol Kane was cast as Miss Baggoli, who directs the school's play. Tom McCamus appears as Lola's father, Calum, who is divorced from her mother and lives in New York City.

Reception
Dennis Harvey of Variety magazine commented in his review that "Based on Dyan Sheldon's popular youth fiction, Confessions of a Teenage Drama Queen emerges a strained showcase for up-and-comer Lindsay Lohan as a sophisticated Big Apple teen unhappily relocated to New Jersey. Minimally funny comedy feels like a Disney Channel pic that got boosted to theatrical after Lohan scored a hit opposite Jamie Lee Curtis in the Freaky Friday remake. Nonetheless, it should have a lock on the 7- to 12-year-old female demo for a couple of weekends before finding longer tube/tape shelf life." UltimateDisney.com reviewed the DVD, saying that it "doesn't garner a recommendation as a film, and its DVD special features are as breezy and shallow as the movie itself. Lindsay Lohan fans and teenage girls are bound to be the most interested, and they might well enjoy it on the surface as light entertainment. But for others, one viewing may be more than enough." Based on 93 reviews collected by Rotten Tomatoes, the film received an average 14% overall approval rating. The site's critical consensus reads: "Confessions of a Teenage Drama Queens superficial tendencies are unlikely to appeal to older viewers—though its colorful candor is decidedly not intended for them in the first place".

Box office
Despite mostly negative critical reception, the film grossed a modest $9.3 million in its opening weekend (February 20–22, 2004), debuting at number two, behind Adam Sandler's 50 First Dates. The film did fairly well at the box office, grossing $29 million domestically and $33 million worldwide.

Soundtrack

The soundtrack was released February 17, 2004, by Hollywood Records and features Lindsay Lohan, Lillix, Simple Plan, and other various artists.

Awards
 2004 - Won; Teen Choice Award for Choice Breakout Movie Actress (Lindsay Lohan)

References

External links
 
 
 
 Confessions of a Teenage Drama Queen Disney site, with suppressible music and voice.

2004 films
2004 comedy films
2000s high school films
2000s musical comedy films
2000s teen comedy films
American high school films
American musical comedy films
American teen comedy films
American teen musical films
Films about actors
Films about music and musicians
Films based on American novels
Films based on young adult literature
Films scored by Mark Mothersbaugh
Films set in New Jersey
Films set in New York City
Films shot in Hamilton, Ontario
Films shot in Montreal
Films shot in New Jersey
Films shot in New York City
Films shot in Toronto
Walt Disney Pictures films
2000s English-language films
2000s American films